The 2023 Nigerian presidential election in Osun State will be held on 25 February 2023 as part of the nationwide 2023 Nigerian presidential election to elect the president and vice president of Nigeria. Other federal elections, including elections to the House of Representatives and the Senate, will also be held on the same date while state elections will be held two weeks afterward on 11 March.

Background
Osun State is a small, Yoruba-majority southwestern state with vast natural areas and rich cultural heritage but facing an underdeveloped agricultural sector and high debt. The state's 2019 elections were competitiveness with presidential incumbent Muhammadu Buhari barely winning the state and all three Senate races being fairly close. Of the Senate elections, two seats went to the APC and one went to the PDP while the House of Representatives elections went 6 APC and 3 PDP. Contrastly, the APC won a large majority in the State House of Assembly. Two years later, Ademola Adeleke (PDP) unseated Gboyega Oyetola (APC)—the incumbent Governor, winning by 3.5% of the vote; however, the election result was overturned by the tribunal and the court dispute continues as of January 2023.

Polling

Projections

General election

Results

By senatorial district 
The results of the election by senatorial district.

By federal constituency
The results of the election by federal constituency.

By local government area 
The results of the election by local government area.

See also 
 2023 Osun State elections
 2023 Nigerian presidential election

Notes

References 

Osun State gubernatorial election
2023 Osun State elections
Osun